In the Woods... is a Norwegian avant-garde metal/progressive black metal band from Kristiansand, formed in 1992. The band have released a total of five studio albums, three singles, one compilation album and one live album throughout its initial existence. The band disbanded in 2000 and reformed in 2014.

History 
The band started out as a death metal band called Green Carnation. With some members leaving, including  Terje Vik Schei (a.k.a. Tchort), the remaining members formed In the Woods... The band released a demo in 1993 called The Isle of Men, as well as a full-length album named Heart of the Ages in 1995. The following, Omnio, had lengthy songs with more female vocals. Their third album was Strange in Stereo.

In 2000, In the Woods... released the album Three Times Seven on a Pilgrimage, a compilation of three of their previous 7" featuring covers from Pink Floyd, Jefferson Airplane and King Crimson, together with some newly released and rebuilt songs, like the new version of Child of Universal Tongue.

After releasing Three Times Seven on a Pilgrimage, the band held a farewell performance in their home town of Kristiansand which featured all musicians, including the former members. The performance was recorded and released as Live at the Caledonien Hall in 2003. Some of the members went on to play in the similarly-styled band Green Carnation, others took up personal projects and founded the independent label Karmakosmetix Records, created to support new experimental bands such as In the Woods... was in its time.

The band's founding guitarist Oddvar A.M., born Oddvar Moi, died on May 13, 2013.

Anders Kobro announced the reformation of the band's core lineup (Kobro, X. Botteri and C:M. Botteri) in 2014. 2015 was the year the newest lineup was announced, featuring Kobro, X. Botteri and C:M Botteri, James Fogarty and guitarist Kåre André Sletteberg. Together, they released the album "Pure" in September 2016 under their new label, Debemur Morti Productions. Keyboard player Job Phenex Bos was joining them for shows during 2016 and 2017.

At the end of 2016, the Botteri brothers left the band leading onto Alex Weisbeek and Bernt Sørensen joining In the Woods... for bass and guitar sessions, but due to a long distance between the core of the band and Weisbeek, the band decided to hire in a local bass player by the name of Nils Olav Drivdal. Drivdal joined the band in December 2018 and played his first concert with the band in Kristiansand in March 2019.

In December 2021 James Fogarty left the band, before the new record was finished. The band ended up looking for a new singer/songwriter and hired Bernt Fjellestad later that month.

On September 28, 2022, the band announced their new album, Diversum, would be released on November 25.

Members

Current members 
 Anders Kobro – drums, percussion (1992–2000, 2014–present)
 Kåre André Sletteberg – guitars, acoustic guitar (2015–present)
 Bernt Sørensen – guitar (2016–present)
 Nils Olav Drivdal – bass (2018–present)
 Bernt Fjellestad - vocals (2021–present)

Past members 
 Christian "X" Botteri – guitars (1992–2000, 2014–2016)
 Christopher "C:M." Botteri – bass (1992–2000, 2014–2016)
 Jan Kenneth Transeth – vocals (1992–2000)
 Oddvar A:M – guitars (1992–2000; died in 2013)
 Bjørn "Berserk" Harstad; guitars (1996–1998)
 Synne "Soprana" Larsen – vocals (1996–2000), session vocals (1994–1996)
 Christer-André Cederberg – guitars (1998–2000)
 Job Phenex Bos – keyboards (live) (2016–2017)
 Alex Weisbeek – bass (2016–2018)
 James Fogarty - vocals, guitars, keyboards (2015-2021)

Timeline

Discography 
 Studio albums
 Heart of the Ages (1995)
 Omnio (1997)
 Strange in Stereo (1999)
 Pure (2016)
 Cease the Day (2018)
 Diversum (2022)

 Compilation albums
 A Return to the Isle of Men (1996)
 Three Times Seven on a Pilgrimage (2000)

 Live albums
 Live at the Caledonien Hall (2003)

 Singles
 "White Rabbit" (7") (1996)
 "Let There Be More Light" (7") (1998)
 "Epitaph" (7") (2000)

 Demos
 Rehearsal 93 (1993)
 Isle of Men (1993)
 Return to the Isle of Men (1996, re-release of the demo with bonus tracks)

See also 
Green Carnation
 Trail of Tears
 Carpathian Forest
 Blood Red Throne
Ewigkeit
 Chain Collector

References

External links 

Norwegian black metal musical groups
Norwegian avant-garde metal musical groups
Musical groups established in 1992
1992 establishments in Norway
Musical groups disestablished in 2000
2000 disestablishments in Norway
Musical groups reestablished in 2014
2014 establishments in Norway
Musical groups from Kristiansand